Jessalyn is a feminine given name. Notable people with the name include:

Jessalyn Gilsig (born 1971), Canadian actress
Jessalyn Van Trump (1887–1939), American actress
Jessalyn Wanlim (born 1982), Canadian actress and model

Feminine given names